United States gubernatorial elections were held in 1921, in two states.

Virginia holds its gubernatorial elections in odd numbered years, every 4 years, following the United States presidential election year.

In North Dakota, the first-ever gubernatorial recall election was held. Incumbent governor Lynn Frazier was the first American governor ever successfully recalled from office; there would not be another successful recall of a governor until California Governor Gray Davis was recalled in 2003.

This election marked Republican's largest gubernatorial extent in history, tying with Jim Justice's party switch in 2017.

Results

Notes

References

 
November 1921 events